Sandra Cristina Frederico de Sá (born August 27, 1955) is a Brazilian singer and songwriter.

Sandra was born in the Pilares neighborhood, in the city of Rio de Janeiro, the daughter of Jurema and Nonô de Sá. Sandra's maternal grandfather, Manoel, was from Cabo Verde.

According to a DNA test, Sandra is 96.7% Black African, 2.1% European, and 1.1% Amerindian.

Biography and career 

She was born in the state of Rio de Janeiro, more specifically the peripheric area Pilares, it is claimed that music is part of her genetics, since her dad was a drummer.

Her deep and powerful voice comes from her  African Descent, being the granddaughter of a Cape Verdean. She has earned multiple awards of the best singer and best song/disc, being considered representative in various musical genres, especially MPB (Brazilian Pop Music) and global black music. Accompanying her father in live shows, in her teenage years, Sandra would participate in folk events of gafieira, samba e soul, in Pilares as well as the area surrounding it.

In 2017, he married composer Simone Floresta. In 2019, he composed a samba-enredo in honor of Elza Soares, composed in partnership with DR Márcio, Igor Vianna, Jefferson Oliveira, Prof. Laranjo, Renan Diniz, Solano Santos, and Telmo Augusto and elected for the 2020 Carnival.

Discography

Studio albums
 Demônio Colorido RGE Discos (1980)
 Sandra Sá (2) RGE Discos (1982)
 Vale Tudo WEA (1983)
 Sandra Sá (3) WEA (1984)
 Sandra Sá (4) WEA (1985)
 Sandra Sá (5) WEA (1986)
 Sandra! (1990)
 Lucky! (1991)
 D'Sá (1993)
 Olhos Coloridos (1994)
 A Lua Sabe Quem Eu Sou (1997, WEA)
 Eu Sempre Fui Sincero, Você Sabe Muito Bem (1998)
 Momentos que Marcam Demais (2000)
 Pare, Olhe, Escute! (2002, Universal Music)
 AfricaNatividade – Cheiro de Brasil (2010)
 Lado B (2015)

Live albums 
 Música Preta Brasileira (2004)

References

External links
 [ Sandra de Sá] at AllMusic

1955 births
Living people
Afro-Brazilian composers
Afro-Brazilian women singers
Brazilian composers
20th-century Brazilian women singers
20th-century Brazilian singers
Brazilian women guitarists
Música Popular Brasileira singers
Música Popular Brasileira guitarists
Brazilian LGBT singers
Bisexual musicians
Bisexual women
Musicians from Rio de Janeiro (city)
Warner Music Group artists
Brazilian soul singers
Brazilian rhythm and blues singer-songwriters
Brazilian funk singers
Brazilian women singer-songwriters
Universidade Gama Filho alumni
21st-century Brazilian women singers
21st-century Brazilian singers
LGBT people in Latin music
Women in Latin music